Esther Huang (born 27 February 1989), formerly known as Albee Huang, is a Taiwanese actress and singer. She is a former member of the Taiwanese girl band Hey Girl. She is sometimes known as Xiao Xun in the media along with other pseudonyms.

Career
Huang is in a girl group originally known as Hei Se Hui Mei Mei which underwent a name change to Hey Girl. Hey Girl consisted of seven other girls, and they are known to work with another popular Taiwanese boyband, Lollipop. Huang has also worked with Ah Ben from Choc7 in The Teen Age.

Filmography

Television series
2006: Angel Lover - Episode 3 
2007: Brown Sugar Macchiato- Xiaoxun 
2007:  The Teen Age - Xia Nian Qiao  
2008: Rolling Love - Wasabi 
2008: The Legend of Brown Sugar Chivalries - Ren Ying Ying 
2011: Love Keeps Going - Han Yi  Fei
2011: Love You
2011: Rookies' Diary
2012: What Is Love
2012: Love Me or Leave Me (TV series)
2014: Fabulous 30
2014:  Dear Mom
2015: Love or Spend
2017: See You in Time

Film
 Double Trouble (2012)
 Love Is Sin (2012)
 The Ideal City (2013)
 Knight of Cups (2013)
 Hang in There, Kids! (2016)
 Hidden Treasures in the Mountain (2018)
 Han Dan (2019)
 Gaga (2022)

Music video appearances
 "I Love Blackie" - (Mei Mei Private Diary)
 "Shining Kiss" - (Mei Mei Private Day - Tian Xin Hong Jia Ji)
 "Shake it baby" - (Mei Mei Private Day - Tian Xin Hong Jia Ji)
 "Sunny Dolls" - (Mei Mei Private Day - Tian Xin Hong Jia Ji)
 "Sweet Sweet Circle / Donuts" - (18 Jin Bu Jin OST)
 "Happiness Bubbles" - (Mei Mei Private Day)
 "Brown Sugar Show" - (Brown Sugar Macchiato OST)
 "Jiao Jie Jie" - (Hey Girl)
 "OOXX" - (Hey Girl)
 "Nu Sheng" - (Hey Girl)
 "哈庫吶瑪塔塔" - (Hey Girl)
 "Slow For Half a Beat" - (黃靖倫 Jing Huang)
 "Hey Girl" - ( 黑Girl)
 "Lovers and Friends" - ( 黑Girl)

Discography

Studio albums
 2008 - Hey Girl (首張同名專輯)

Extended plays
 2006 - Wo Ai Hei Se Hui mei mei(我愛黑澀會)
 2006 - Mei Mei Si Mi De Yi Tian - Fen Hong Gao Ya Dian / Tian Xin Hong Jia Ji  (美眉私密的一天 - 粉紅高壓電 / 甜心轟炸機)
 2007 - Mei Mei Si Mi Party(美眉私密Party)
 2011 - Hey Girl (黑Girl )

Soundtrack
 2007 - 18 Jin Bu Jin OST (18禁不禁電視原聲帶)
 2007 - Brown Sugar Macchiato OST (黑糖瑪奇朵原聲帶)
 2008 - The Legend of Brown Sugar Chivalries OST (黑糖群俠傳電視原聲帶)

References

External links

1989 births
Atayal people
Living people
Taiwanese film actresses
Taiwanese television actresses
21st-century Taiwanese actresses
Musicians from Taoyuan City
21st-century Taiwanese singers
21st-century Taiwanese women singers
Actresses from Taoyuan City